Florbal Chodov (FAT PIPE Florbal Chodov after its sponsor) is a floorball team based in Chodov, Prague, Czech Republic. The team was founded in 1991.

The men's team have played in the highest Czech floorball league, Superliga florbalu, since its foundation in 1993. With two titles in the 2015–16 and 2016–17 seasons, it is the fourth most successful team of the league, after Tatran Střešovice, 1. SC Vítkovice and Florbal MB.

The women's team have also played in the highest Czech floorball league, Extraliga žen ve florbale, since the 2005–06 season. The team won the league in the 2014–15 season.

Honours

Titles
 Men: Superliga florbalu: 2015–16 and 2016–17
 Women: Extraliga žen ve florbale: 2014–15

References

External links
 Official website 
 Club profile 

Czech floorball teams
Sport in Prague